The Unfolding is a 2016 British horror film directed by Eugene McGing and starring Lachlan Nieboer, Lisa Kerr, Robert Daws, Nick Julian and Kitty McGeever. Much of it is filmed in the style of found footage movies. The Unfolding had its TV premiere on 21 August 2016 on the Horror Channel.

Plot

In autumn, 2016, the world stands at the brink of nuclear war.  In the context of this, a young researcher and his girlfriend go to an old house in rural England.  In the house they find themselves at the mercy of an evil presence.

Cast
 Lachlan Nieboer as Tam Burke
 Lisa Kerr as Rose Ellis
 Robert Daws as Professor Chessman
 Nick Julian as Harvey Waller
 Kitty McGeever as Muriel Roy

References

1. Martin Unsworth review for Starburst Magazine
https://www.starburstmagazine.com/features/trio-of-evil-feature

2. Richard Axtell review for Nerdly.
https://www.nerdly.co.uk/2016/03/03/the-unfolding-vod-review-frightfest-presents/

3. Oli Palmer review for Screenrelish.

https://www.screenrelish.com/2016/03/13/the-unfolding-review/

4. Jessy Williams review for Scream Magazine

https://www.screamhorrormag.com/the-unfolding-film-review/

5. Paul Metcalf review for Pissed Off Geek
http://www.pissedoffgeek.com/2016/03/20/the-unfolding-review/#.W8S_Zvko8y4

External links
 
 

2016 films
2016 horror films
British horror films
2010s English-language films
2010s British films